Adelbert Heinrich Graf von Baudissin (born 25 January 1820 in Horsens, Jutland, died 28 March 1871 in Wiesbaden) was a German writer.

Works
 There and there. Loose leaves from a human life. Hanover, Rümpler 1862
 History of the Schleswig-Holstein War. Hanover 1862. 751 p. Digitized
 Christian VII and his court. Historical novel. Hanover, Rümpler (no year) 1863
 The Burk family. Your deeds, dreams and thoughts. Recorded by AHv Baudissin, in 3 volumes. Hanover, Rümpler 1863 (vol. 1, 237 p .; vol. 2, 226 p .; vol. 3 oA)
 Schleswig-Holstein soldier stories. Hanover, Rümpler 1863. 127 p.
 Philippine Welser or three hundred years ago. Novel. Hanover, Rümpler (no year) 1864
 Schleswig-Holstein wrapped around the sea. Pictures of war and peace from 1864. Stuttgart, Hallberger 1865, 371 pages (reprint. Kiel, Schramm 1978, 371 pages)
 Look into the future of the North Frisian Islands and the Schleswig mainland coast. Schleswig, Spethmann 1867. 101 pages
 The manuscript found, or my name is Scholtz, comedy in an elevator. Schleswig, Deaf and Dumb - Inst., 1867. 34 p.

References

German male writers
1820 births
1871 deaths